Wells Creek is an impact crater located near Cumberland City, Tennessee. The crater is exposed to the surface. The center of the crater contains some of the finest shatter cones in the world. Many have been collected and are on display around the world.

Gallery

References

External links 
 Wells Creek Crater at Tennessee Landforms
 Wells Creek Impact Structure at Crater Explorer

Impact craters of the United States
Mesozoic impact craters
Landforms of Houston County, Tennessee
Landforms of Stewart County, Tennessee